The McLaren MP4-22 is a Formula One racing car that was constructed by the Vodafone McLaren Mercedes team to compete in the 2007 Formula One World Championship. The chassis was designed by Paddy Lowe, Neil Oatley, Pat Fry, Mike Coughlan and Simon Lacey, with Andy Cowell and Mario Illien designing the bespoke Mercedes-Benz engine. The car was revealed in testing at Circuit de Valencia in Spain on 15 January 2007, and was driven by double World Champion Fernando Alonso and debutant Lewis Hamilton.

The MP4-22 proved to be one of the most competitive cars of the season, with Alonso and Hamilton achieving four victories each. However, a fierce rivalry between the two drivers, combined with the 2007 Formula One espionage controversy, resulted in McLaren losing both championships to Scuderia Ferrari Marlboro.

Development
In its design philosophy behind the new car, the team says the MP4-22 features "some advanced engineering concepts" and "novel aerodynamic solutions".

On 17 January 2007, Fernando Alonso completed a shakedown test in the Ricardo Tormo circuit in Valencia, setting the fastest lap time of 1:12.050.

At testing in Catalunya on 1 May 2007, Pedro de la Rosa tested the car with a new unique front wing design that would see extensive use throughout the remainder of the season. It featured a thin carbon fibre wing that spanned from the top of each end plate, bypassing the nosecone by arching over it. This new wing subsequently made its racing debut at the Spanish Grand Prix. The wing was deemed surplus to requirements during the 2007 Italian Grand Prix due to the high speed/low drag characteristics required.

As part of new FIA rules for the 2008 season which included banning driver aids via the introduction of a standard ECU for all teams, the MP4-22 was the last McLaren Formula One car to use traction control.

2007 season
The MP4-22 proved to be far more competitive than its similar-looking predecessor and McLaren scored eight victories, compared to a winless 2006 season. The car proved to be the most reliable car of the season, with no mechanical retirements in any race, and one of the two fastest cars on the field (along with the Ferraris). The low downforce package of the MP4-22 was extremely competitive. McLaren, with the aid of their improved car, scored as many team points in the first half of 2007 as they had done during the entire year in 2006. However the team's season was marred by a fierce rivalry between its drivers Hamilton and Alonso, as well as a fall out between Alonso and the team's management. This contributed to both drivers eventually losing the championship by one point to Ferrari's Kimi Räikkönen, despite having led the championship for most of the season. McLaren led the Constructors' Championship from the start of the season until the Italian Grand Prix, after which they were excluded from the championship due to allegations that the MP4-22 used data obtained from rivals Ferrari. This led the MP4-22 failing to win either championship despite its competitiveness.

The McLaren race drivers completed 5,340 racing kilometres in the 2007 season, 45% of which were whilst leading a race.  The MP4-22 also completed 27,150 kilometres in testing; Fernando Alonso, Lewis Hamilton, Pedro de la Rosa, Gary Paffett and Jamie Green completed 8,277 km, 7,714 km, 8,277 km, 2,842 km and 28 km respectively.

The MP4-22 was succeeded by the McLaren MP4-23.

Gallery

Complete Formula One results
(key) (results in bold indicate pole position; results in italics indicate fastest lap)

 McLaren did not receive points for the constructors' championship in Hungary.

* McLaren were stripped of all WCC points due to the 2007 espionage controversy.

Notes and references

External links

Technical Specifications of the MP4-22
Vodafone McLaren Mercedes MP4-22 Design Philosophy
Technical Team Biographies

McLaren MP4 22
2007 Formula One season cars